Haradum (modern Khirbit ed-Diniye (also Khirbet ed-Diniyé), Iraq) was an ancient Near East city on the middle Euphrates about 90 kilometers southeast of Mari. It was part of the ancient region of Suhum. The name of the town meant "the  place  where  one  stands  watch".

History
While the site of Haradum was occupied earlier, under the control of Eshnunna, being mentioned in texts from Mari,
 it did not grow into a proper town until the 18th century BC under the control of the First Dynasty of Babylon.

Babylonian period
The earliest dated record is from the 26th year of King Samsu-iluna of Babylon.
Tablets from the reign of Abi-eshuh, Ammi-ditana, Ammi-saduqa,
and Samsu-Ditana have also been found at Haradum. The town of Haradum was destroyed during the reign of Samsu-Ditana.

Haradum is noted for being one of the earliest examples of a planned city, with a rectilinear layout and straight streets. It contained two temples (dedicated to Ishtar and Adad respectively) but no palace.

Archaeology
The site of Haradum is small, about 1.5 hectares in area. It was excavated for six seasons in the 1980s by a team from the Délégation Archéologique Française en Iraq led by Christine Kepinski-Lecomte. A number of cuneiform tablets were found in residential and temple contexts. The work was a salvage operation in response to dam construction.

See also

 Cities of the ancient Near East
Short chronology timeline

Notes

References
Christine Kepinski-Lecompte, Haradum I: Une ville nouvelle sur le Moyen-Euphrate, Editions Recherche sur les Civilisations, 1992, 
F. Joannes, C. Kepinski-Lecompte, Gudrun Colbow, Haradum II. Les Textes de la Periode Paleo-Babylonienne (Samsu-iluna - Ammi-saduqa), ERC, 2006, 
C. Kepinski, Material Culture of a Babylonian Outpost on the Iraqi Middle Euphrates: the Case of Haradum during the Middle Bronze Age, Akkadica, vol. 126, pp. 121–131, 2005
 Mark W. Chavalas, Terqa and Haradum: A Comparative Analysis of Old Babylonian Period Houses Along the Euphrates

External links
Site Plan of Haradum town center
Site Plan of Haradum at La Maison René-Ginouvès

Archaeological sites in Iraq
Former populated places in Iraq